Constance A. Flanagan is the University of Wisconsin–Madison School of Human Ecology Vaughan Bascom Professor in Women, Family and Community.

References 

 https://www.bostonglobe.com/ideas/2012/10/06/inside-minds-tomorrow-voters/e9RObzpguQRQBUznHAhVbJ/story.html

Living people
University of Wisconsin–Madison faculty
Year of birth missing (living people)